The GER Class Y65 was a class of twelve  steam locomotives designed by S. D. Holden and built by the company's Stratford Works in 1909–1910. They all passed to the London and North Eastern Railway at the 1923 grouping and received the classification F7.

History
These locomotives were fitted with  cylinders and  diameter driving wheels. They were intended to displace the elderly E22 class  locomotives from their light branch line duties, but in the end, the E22s were the preferred locomotives for this work. They were all initially fitted with Westinghouse air brake equipment.

Between 1915 and 1921 four (1303–1305, 1309) were fitted for push-pull working using the compressed air system; these required the fitting of an extra Westinghouse pump to the side of the locomotives. In 1924, 8307 was also push-pull fitted using the mechanical system for use on the Great Central section; no extra pump was needed, but it did gain a vacuum ejector. 

All had survived to pass to the LNER in 1923; the first retirement started in 1931 when four were withdrawn.

Three (8301/08/10) were sent to Scotland in 1931–32 and as a result of the move they had their Westinghouse air brake replaced with a steam brake and vacuum ejector.

The locomotives had large cabs, with large spectacle plate front and rear, which earned the nickname "Crystal Palace tanks"; those in Scotland were nicknamed "Tomato houses".

Withdrawals continued from 1938; six locomotives were left in 1942 when they were renumbered 7593–7598 in order to clear the 8300-block for new B1 class locomotives.

Two locomotives lasted long enough to be renumbered in the 1946 scheme; they became the property of British Railways in 1948, but both were withdrawn the same year without receiving their BR number.

References

Y65
2-4-2T locomotives
Railway locomotives introduced in 1909
Scrapped locomotives
Standard gauge steam locomotives of Great Britain
Passenger locomotives